Earl William Murray (July 16, 1926 – July 14, 1994) was an American football guard who played three seasons in the National Football League with the Baltimore Colts, New York Giants and Pittsburgh Steelers. He was drafted by the Baltimore Colts in the fourth round of the 1950 NFL Draft. He played college football at Purdue University and attended Dayton High School in Dayton, Kentucky.

References

External links
Just Sports Stats

1926 births
1994 deaths
Players of American football from Kentucky
American football guards
Purdue Boilermakers football players
Baltimore Colts players
New York Giants players
Pittsburgh Steelers players
People from Dayton, Kentucky
Baltimore Colts (1947–1950) players